The Ambassador from New Zealand to Vietnam is New Zealand's foremost diplomatic representative in the Socialist Republic of Vietnam, and in charge of New Zealand's diplomatic mission in Vietnam.

The embassy is located in Hanoi, Vietnam's capital city.  New Zealand has maintained a resident ambassador in Vietnam since 1995.

List of heads of mission

Ambassadors to Vietnam

Non-resident ambassadors, resident in Beijing
 Bryce Harland (1975–1976)
 Dick Atkins (1976–1979)

Non-resident ambassadors, resident in Bangkok
 Richard Taylor (1979–1981)
 Ray Jermyn (1981–1986)
 Bruce Brown (1986–1988)
 Harle Freeman-Greene (1988–1992)
 Phillip Gibson (1992–1995)

Resident ambassadors
 David Kersey (1995–1998)
 Yan Flint (1998–2000)
 Malcolm McGoun (2000–2004)
 Michael Chilton (2004–2006)
 James Kember (2006 - )
 Haike Manning (2012 - 2016)
 Wendy Matthews (2016-)

See also
 List of Ambassadors from New Zealand to South Vietnam, for a list of chief diplomatic representatives in Vietnam before 1975.

References
 New Zealand Heads of Overseas Missions: Vietnam.  New Zealand Ministry of Foreign Affairs and Trade.  Retrieved on 2008-03-29.

Vietnam, Ambassadors from New Zealand to
New Zealand